repa

The Masjid Al Kausar ( or also known as Masjid Al Kousar is a mosque in Hyderabad, Telangana India.

Built in 1997 and completed in 2002, it is the  mosque in the Hafiz Baba Nagar, Hyderabad, with a capacity that can accommodate from 16,000 to 17,000 people. The mosque was officially opened in 2004, officiated by the Mujahid Ali Qasmi at the time, Syed Sirajuddin Tuanku Syed Putra Jamalullail.

References

Mosques in Hyderabad, India